Björn Dreyer (born 17 January 1989) is a German football coach and former player. He works at SV Werder Bremen as a youth team coach.

References

External links
 

1989 births
Living people
People from Osterode am Harz
Footballers from Lower Saxony
German footballers
Association football defenders
3. Liga players
SV Werder Bremen II players
FC Oberneuland players
TuS Heeslingen players